This is a list of settlements in Gloucestershire by population based on the results of the 2011 census. The next United Kingdom census will take place in 2021. In 2011, there were 23 built-up area subdivisions with 5,000 or more inhabitants in Gloucestershire, shown in the table below.

Population ranking 

Notes:

* This is the parliamentary constituency count. It groups nearly all the urban suburb areas east of Bristol. Borders changed in 2010 which reflected in the 2011 reduction. See talk page for further discussion

** Contiguous with Kingswood. Council ward counts

See also 

 Gloucestershire

References

External links 
 ONS Census website

 
Gloucestershire-related lists
Gloucestershire